Gaston Adjoukoua was an Ivorian football midfielder who played for Ivory Coast in the 1980 and 1984 African Cup of Nations. He also played for Asec d'Abidjan at club level.

References

External links

11v11 Profile

1958 births
2015 deaths
Ivorian footballers
Ivory Coast international footballers
Ivory Coast under-20 international footballers
1980 African Cup of Nations players
Africa Sports d'Abidjan players
Association football midfielders